Liarea ornata is a species of small air-breathing land snail, a terrestrial gastropod mollusc in the family Pupinidae.

Distribution 
This species occurs in New Zealand.

References

Pupinidae
Gastropods of New Zealand